Dprevank is a village in the Ashtarak Municipality of the Aragatsotn Province of Armenia. The village is on the road from Dzoragyugh to Tsakhkasar. The village has been founded in 1991-1992 by Armenian refugees fleeing from Mədrəsə village of Shamakhi Distric of Azerbaijan.

References 

Populated places in Aragatsotn Province